Thomas Clayton (July 1777 – August 21, 1854) was an American lawyer and politician from Dover in Kent County, Delaware. He was a member of the Federalist Party and later the National Republican Party and the Whig Party. He served in the Delaware General Assembly, as Attorney General of Delaware, as Secretary of State of Delaware, as Chief Justice of the Delaware Supreme Court, as U.S. Representative from Delaware, and as U.S. Senator from Delaware. In 1846 he was one of two members of the United States Senate to vote against declaring war on Mexico.

Early life and family

Clayton was born at Massey in Kent County, Maryland, son of the former Governor of Delaware, Dr. Joshua Clayton, and Rachael McCleary Clayton. It is said he was born while his mother was fleeing invading British troops on the way from their Elk River landing to the Battle of Brandywine. While the Clayton's were natives of Kent County, Delaware, Rachael McCleary was the niece and adopted daughter of Richard Bassett, the aristocratic heir to the expansive Bohemia Manor estates. The family lived at Bohemia Manor and through this connection, Joshua Clayton later acquired his homestead from these estates, in Pencader Hundred, New Castle County.

Thomas Clayton graduated from the Newark Academy, now the University of Delaware, studied law under Nicholas Ridgely in Dover, Delaware, and began a law practice there in 1799. His wife's name was Jennette Macomb, they had four children, and belonged to the Presbyterian Church. He was the cousin of U.S. Senator John M. Clayton.

Professional and political career
While pursuing his practice of the law, Clayton began his public career as the clerk of the Delaware House of Representatives in 1800. He then served as a member of that body for 8 years, between the 1803 session and the 1814 session. He was elected to the Delaware Senate for the 1808 session, but resigned to become the Delaware Secretary of State for 2 years. Subsequently, he was appointed the Delaware Attorney General and served in that office from 1810 until 1815.

In 1814 Clayton was elected as a Federalist to one of two at-large seats Delaware had in the U.S. House of Representatives, and served one term there, from March 4, 1815 until March 3, 1817. While he was in Congress, it was proposed that the compensation given U.S. Representatives be increased $6 a day to $1,500 a year. Clayton supported the change, but it became very controversial, and his support of it caused him to lose the nomination of the Federalist Party to Louis McLane, beginning a long rivalry between the two men.

Clayton narrowly failed in an attempt to return to the U.S. House of Representatives in the 1818 election, but was returned to the Delaware Senate again in 1821. Then, when Caesar A. Rodney resigned as U.S. Senator from Delaware, the General Assembly elected him to serve out the term, from January 8, 1824 to March 3, 1827. This was the time when the old party system of Federalists and Jeffersonian Republicans was giving way to the Jacksonian Democrats, and those opposed to Jackson. Clayton, his family, and much of the old Federalist following in Delaware, aligned themselves with John Quincy Adams, and the National Republicans who would later become Whigs.

After his term in the U.S. Senate ended, Clayton was appointed Chief Justice of the Delaware Court of Common Pleas in 1828. This court ceased to exist with the new Delaware Constitution of 1831, and Clayton was appointed Chief Justice of the new Delaware Superior Court in 1832. In 1833, Chief Justice Clayton became one of the initial trustees of Newark College in Newark, Delaware, which would later become the University of Delaware.

In 1837, Clayton's cousin, U.S. Senator John M. Clayton, resigned his office. Thomas Clayton was once again elected to the U.S. Senate to finish the term. After it ended, he was reelected in 1841 and served from January 9, 1837 to March 3, 1847. During this second period of service in the Senate, Clayton was at various times the Chairman of the Committee on Printing and a member of the Committee of Revolutionary Claims.

Death and legacy
Clayton died of pneumonia at his retirement home at New Castle and is buried in the Old Presbyterian Cemetery, which is at Dover, on the grounds of the Delaware State Museum.

"A handsome man with polished manners, he was a stickler for dignity, decorum and punctuality at court session, and once ordered himself fined $10 for being 10 minutes late in appearing in court."

Thomas Scharf comments: "Chief Justice Clayton was profoundly versed in the principles of the law. He had a marvelous skill in perceiving the vital points of a case, largely due to his almost intuitive grasp of fundamental principles. He was prompt in deciding the merits of an issue and felicitous in the precision with which he formulated facts and conclusions. His words were few but masterly in force and point. Judge Clayton was eminently impartial in his judicial capacity. Neither distinction of the person nor relationships swayed his judgments. With respect to the lawyers at the Bar, he made no difference in the administration of rules between the eminent John M. Clayton and his own son who was a practitioner at the same bar. He meted out to all the same even-handed justice, and required of all the same respectful regard for the law and for decorum."

Almanac
Elections were held the first Tuesday of October. Members of the General Assembly took office on the first Tuesday of January. State Senators had a three-year term and State Representatives had a one-year term. The Secretary of State and Attorney General were appointed by the Governor and took office on the third Tuesday of January for a five-year term. U.S. Representatives took office March 4 and have a two-year term.

The General Assembly chose the U.S. Senators, who also took office March 4, but for a six-year term. In this case, he was initially completing the existing term, the vacancy caused by the resignation of Caesar A. Rodney. However, the General Assembly failed to fill the position for nearly a year.

Notes

References

External links
Biographical Directory of the United States Congress
Delaware’s Members of Congress

The Political Graveyard

1777 births
1854 deaths
People from Cecil County, Maryland
Presbyterians from Maryland
Federalist Party members of the United States House of Representatives from Delaware
National Republican Party United States senators from Delaware
Whig Party United States senators from Delaware
Delaware Attorneys General
Secretaries of State of Delaware
Members of the Delaware House of Representatives
Delaware state senators
Chief Justices of Delaware
Delaware Court of Common Pleas judges
People from Dover, Delaware
Delaware lawyers
19th-century American lawyers
University of Delaware alumni
Deaths from pneumonia in Delaware
Burials in Dover, Delaware